Peter James de Lange (born 1966) is a New Zealand botanist.

Born and schooled in Hamilton, New Zealand, he graduated from the University of Waikato as B.Sc. in biological and earth sciences, then as M.Sc. in paleoecology and tephrochronostratigraphy. He has a PhD from the University of Auckland, the subject of his thesis, the biosystematics of Kunzea ericoides (kānuka). From 1990 to 2017 he worked as a threatened plant scientist in the Ecosystems and Species Unit of Research and Development in the New Zealand Department of Conservation. He is an adjunct professor at the University of Sassari in Sardinia and now employed as an associate professor in the School of Environmental & Animal Sciences, Unitec Institute of Technology in New Zealand. He is a Fellow of the Linnean Society, recipient of the New Zealand Botanical Society Allan Mere award (2006) and also the Loder Cup (2017) for his botanical work. One plant, the Three Kings Islands endemic kawakawa (pepper) described in 1997 as Macropiper excelsum subsp peltatum f. delangei and now placed in Piper, as P. excelsum subsp. delangei is named in his honour. In February 2021 a lichen, Amandinea delangei was also named in his honour based on specimens he had collected from Te Wakatehaua, Oneroa-o-Tohe (Ninety Mile Beach), Te Aupouri, Northland, North Island, New Zealand. He is the author of 30 books and 180 scientific papers.

References

1966 births
20th-century New Zealand botanists
Living people
People from Hamilton, New Zealand
21st-century New Zealand botanists